Eucamptognathus trisulcatus is a species of ground beetle in the subfamily Pterostichinae. It was described by Henry Walter Bates in 1879.

References

Eucamptognathus
Beetles described in 1879